Cyrtodactylus consobrinus, also known as Peters's bow-fingered gecko or the thin-banded forest gecko,  is a species of gecko that is found on the Malaysian peninsula and Borneo.

References 

Cyrtodactylus
Reptiles described in 1871
Taxa named by Wilhelm Peters